The surname Revazov, female form Revazova is a patronymic derivation from the Georgian given name Revaz.

The surname may refer to:
 Arsen Revazov (born 1966), Russian writer and photographer

Georgian-language surnames